R.U.R. is a 1920 science-fiction play by the Czech writer Karel Čapek. The play had its world premiere on 2 January 1921 in Hradec Králové; it introduced the word "robot" to the English language and to science fiction as a whole. R.U.R. soon became influential after its publication. By 1923, it had been translated into thirty languages. R.U.R. was successful in its time in Europe and North America. Čapek later took a different approach to the same theme in his 1936 novel War with the Newts, in which non-humans become a servant-class in human society.

Premise 
The play begins in a factory that makes artificial people, called roboti (robots), whom humans have created from synthetic organic matter. (As living creatures of artificial flesh and blood rather than machinery, the play's concept of robots diverges from the idea of "robots" as inorganic. Later terminology would call them androids.) Robots may be mistaken for humans and can think for themselves. Initially happy to work for humans, the robots revolt and cause the extinction of the human race.

Characters 

Parentheses indicate names which vary according to translation. On the meaning of the names, see Ivan Klíma, Karel Čapek: Life and Work, 2002, p. 82.

Human 
 Harry Domin (Domain): General Manager, R.U.R.
 Fabry: Chief Engineer, R.U.R.
 Dr. Gall: Head of the Physiological Department, R.U.R.
 Dr. Hellman (Hallemeier): Psychologist-in-Chief
 Jacob Berman (Busman): Managing Director, R.U.R.
 Alquist: Clerk of the Works, R.U.R.
 Helena Glory: President of the Humanity League, daughter of President Glory
 Emma (Nana): Helena's maid

Robots and robotesses 
 Marius, a robot
 Sulla,  a robotess
 Radius, a robot
 Primus, a robot
 Helena, a robotess
 Daemon (Damon), a robot

Plot

Act I 

Helena, the daughter of the president of a major industrial power, arrives at the island factory of Rossum's Universal Robots. Here, she meets Domin, the General Manager of R.U.R., who relates to her the history of the company. Rossum had come to the island in 1920 to study marine biology. In 1932, Rossum had invented a substance like organic matter, though with a different chemical composition. He argued with his nephew about their motivations for creating artificial life. While the elder wanted to create animals to prove or disprove the existence of God, his nephew  only wanted to become rich. Young Rossum finally locked away his uncle in a lab to play with the monstrosities he had created and created thousands of robots. By the time the play takes place (circa the year 2000), robots are cheap and available all over the world. They have become essential for industry.

After meeting the heads of R.U.R., Helena reveals that she is a representative of the League of Humanity, an organization that wishes to liberate the robots. The managers of the factory find this absurd. They see robots as appliances. Helena asks that the robots be paid, but according to R.U.R. management, the robots do not "like" anything.

Eventually Helena is convinced that the League of Humanity is a waste of money, but still argues robots have a "soul". Later, Domin confesses that he loves Helena and forces her into an engagement.

Act II 
Ten years have passed. Helena and her nurse Nana discuss current events, the decline in human births in particular. Helena and Domin reminisce about the day they met and summarize the last ten years of world history, which has been shaped by the new worldwide robot-based economy. Helena meets Dr. Gall's new experiment, Radius. Dr. Gall describes his experimental robotess, also named Helena. Both are more advanced, fully-featured robots. In secret, Helena burns the formula required to create robots.  The revolt of the robots reaches Rossum's island as the act ends.

Act III 

The characters sense that the very universality of the robots presents a danger. Echoing the story of the Tower of Babel, the characters discuss whether creating national robots who were unable to communicate beyond their languages would have been a good idea. As robot forces lay siege to the factory, Helena reveals she has burned the formula necessary to make new robots.  The characters lament the end of humanity and defend their actions, despite the fact that their imminent deaths are a direct result of their choices.  Busman is killed while attempting to negotiate a peace with the robots. The robots storm the factory and kill all the humans except for Alquist, the company's chief engineer. The robots spare him because they recognize that "he works with his hands like the robots."

Epilogue 
Years have passed. Alquist, who still lives, attempts to recreate the formula that Helena destroyed. He is a mechanical engineer, though, with insufficient knowledge of biochemistry, so he has made little progress. The robot government has searched for surviving humans to help Alquist and found none alive. Officials from the robot government beg him to complete the formula, even if it means he will have to kill and dissect other robots for it. Alquist yields. He will kill and dissect robots, thus completing the circle of violence begun in Act Two. Alquist is disgusted. Robot Primus and Helena develop human feelings and fall in love. Playing a hunch, Alquist threatens to dissect Primus and then Helena; each begs him to take him- or herself and spare the other. Alquist now realizes that Primus and Helena are the new Adam and Eve, and gives charge of the world to them.

Čapek's conception of robots 

The robots described in Čapek's play are not robots in the popularly understood sense of an automaton. They are not mechanical devices, but rather artificial
biological organisms that may be mistaken for humans. A comic scene at the beginning of the play shows Helena arguing with her future husband, Harry Domin, because she cannot believe his secretary is a robotess:

DOMIN: Sulla, let Miss Glory have a look at you.
HELENA: (stands and offers her hand) Pleased to meet you.  It must be very hard for you out here, cut off from the rest of the world.
SULLA: I do not know the rest of the world Miss Glory. Please sit down.
HELENA: (sits) Where are you from?
SULLA: From here, the factory.
HELENA: Oh, you were born here.
SULLA: Yes I was made here.
HELENA: (startled) What?
DOMIN: (laughing) Sulla isn't a person, Miss Glory, she's a robot.
HELENA: Oh, please forgive me...

His robots resemble more modern conceptions of man-made life forms, such as the Replicants in Blade Runner, the "hosts" in the Westworld TV series and the humanoid Cylons in the re-imagined Battlestar Galactica, but in Čapek's time there was no conception of modern genetic engineering (DNA's role in heredity was not confirmed until 1952). There are descriptions of kneading-troughs for robot skin, great vats for liver and brains, and a factory for producing bones. Nerve fibers, arteries, and intestines are spun on factory bobbins, while the robots themselves are assembled like automobiles. Čapek's robots are living biological beings, but they are still assembled, as opposed to grown or born.

One critic has described Čapek's robots as epitomizing "the traumatic transformation of modern society by the First World War and the Fordist assembly line."

Origin of the word "robot" 
The play introduced the word robot, which displaced older words such as "automaton" or "android" in languages around the world.  In an article in Lidové noviny, Karel Čapek named his brother Josef as the true inventor of the word.  In Czech, robota means forced labour of the kind that serfs had to perform on their masters' lands and is derived from rab, meaning "slave".

The name Rossum is an allusion to the Czech word rozum, meaning "reason", "wisdom", "intellect" or "common sense". It has been suggested that the allusion might be preserved by translating "Rossum" as "Reason" but only the Majer/Porter version translates the word as "Reason".

Production history and translations 

The work was published in two differing versions in Prague by Aventinum in 1920 and 1921. After being postponed, it premiered at the city's National Theatre on 25 January 1921, although an amateur group had by then already presented a production.

Already in 1921, 'R.U.R.' was translated from Czech into English by Paul Selver, and was adapted for the stage in English by Nigel Playfair in 1922.

The American première which derived from the adapted text was at the Garrick Theatre in New York City in October 1922, where it ran for 184 performances, a production in which Spencer Tracy and Pat O'Brien played robots in their Broadway debuts. Helena was portrayed by Kentuckian actress and antiwar activist Mary Crane Hone in her Broadway debut.

In April 1923 Basil Dean produced R.U.R. in Britain for the Reandean Company at St Martin's Theatre, London.

In the 1920s, the play was performed in a number of American and British cities, e.g. the Theatre Guild "Road" in Chicago and Los Angeles during 1923.

In 1923, two different adapted versions of the translation were published, relating to the American and British premiéres respectively. The US version was published in Garden City by Doubleday, Page & Company, the British one in London by Humphrey Milford, Oxford University Press.
Both published versions abridged the play and eliminated a Robot character named "Damon", the other changes, however, differed. 

In 1989, a new, unabridged translation by Claudia Novack-Jones restored the elements of the play eliminated by Selver. Another unabridged translation was produced by Peter Majer and Cathy Porter for Methuen Drama in 1999.

Critical reception 
Reviewing the New York production of  R.U.R., The Forum magazine described the play as "thought-provoking" and "a highly original thriller". John Clute has lauded R.U.R. as "a play of exorbitant wit and almost demonic energy" and lists the play as one of the "classic titles" of inter-war science fiction. Luciano Floridi has described the play thus: "Philosophically rich and controversial, R.U.R. was unanimously acknowledged as a masterpiece from its first appearance, and has become a classic of technologically dystopian literature." Jarka M. Burien called R.U.R. a "theatrically effective, prototypal sci-fi melodrama".

On the other hand, Isaac Asimov, author of the Robot series of books and creator of the Three Laws of Robotics, stated: "Capek's play is, in my own opinion, a terribly bad one, but it is immortal for that one word. It contributed the word 'robot' not only to English, but through English, to all the languages in which science fiction is now written." In fact, Asimov's "Laws of Robotics" are specifically and explicitly designed to prevent the kind of situation depicted in R.U.R. – since Asimov's Robots are created with a built-in total inhibition against harming human beings or disobeying them.

Adaptations 
 On 11 February 1938, a 35-minute adaptation of a section of the play was broadcast on BBC Television—the first piece of television science-fiction ever to be broadcast. Some low quality stills have survived, although no recordings of the production are known to exist. and in 1948, another television adaptation—this time of the entire play, running to 90 minutes—was screened by the BBC with Radius played by Patrick Troughton, who was later the second actor to play The Doctor in Doctor Who.
 BBC Radio has broadcast a number of productions, including a 1927 2LO London version, a 1933 BBC Regional Programme version, a 1941 BBC Home Service version, and a 1946 BBC Home Service version,. BBC Radio 3 dramatised the play again in 1989, and this version has been released commercially.  A light-hearted 2-part musical adaptation was broadcast on April 3rd and 10th 2022 on BBC Radio 4, with story by Robert Hudson and music by Susannah Pearse; the second episode continues the story after all humans have been killed and the robots now have emotions.
 The Hollywood Theater of the Ear dramatized an unabridged audio version of R.U.R. which is available on the collection 2000x: Tales of the Next Millennia.
 In August 2010, Portuguese multi-media artist Leonel Moura's R.U.R.: The Birth of the Robot, inspired by the Čapek play, was performed at Itaú Cultural in São Paulo, Brazil. It utilized actual robots on stage interacting with the human actors.
 An electro-rock musical, Save The Robots is based on R.U.R., featuring the music of the New York City pop-punk art-rock band Hagatha. This version with book and adaptation by E. Ether, music by Rob Susman, and lyrics by Clark Render wa an official selection of the 2014 New York Musical Theatre Festival season.
 On 26 November 2015 The RUR-Play: Prologue, the world's first version of R.U.R. with robots appearing in all the roles, was presented during the robot performance festival of Cafe Neu Romance at the gallery of the National Library of Technology in Prague. The concept and initiative for the play came from Christian Gjørret, leader of "Vive Les Robots!"  who, on 29 January 2012, during a meeting with Steven Canvin of LEGO Group, presented the proposal to Lego, that supported the piece with the LEGO MINDSTORMS robotic kit. The robots were built and programmed by students from the R.U.R team from Gymnázium Jeseník. The play was directed by Filip Worm and the team was led by Roman Chasák, both teachers from the Gymnázium Jeseník.

In popular culture 
 Eric, a robot constructed in Britain in 1928 for public appearances, bore the letters "R.U.R." across its chest.
 The 1935 Soviet film Loss of Sensation, though based on the 1929 novel Iron Riot, has a similar concept to R.U.R., and all the robots in the film prominently display the name "R.U.R."
 In the American science fiction television series Dollhouse, the antagonist corporation, Rossum Corp., is named after the play.
 In the Star Trek episode "Requiem for Methuselah", the android's name is Rayna Kapec (an anagram, though not a homophone, of Capek, Čapek without its háček).
 In the two-part Batman: The Animated Series episode "Heart of Steel", the scientist that created the HARDAC machine is named Karl Rossum. HARDAC created mechanical replicants to replace existing humans, with the ultimate goal of replacing all humans. One of the robots is seen driving a car with "RUR" as the license plate number.
 In the 1977  Doctor Who serial "The Robots of Death", the robot servants turn on their human masters under the influence of an individual named Taren Capel.
 In the 1978 Norwegian TV series Blindpassasjer, Rossum is the name of a planet ruled by robots.
 In the 1995 science fiction series The Outer Limits, in the remake of the "I, Robot" episode from the original 1964 series, the business where the robot Adam Link is built is named "Rossum Hall Robotics".
 The 1999 Blake's 7 radio play The Syndeton Experiment included a character named Dr. Rossum who turned humans into robots.
 In the "Fear of a Bot Planet" episode of the animated science fiction TV series Futurama, the Planet Express crew is ordered to make a delivery on a planet called "Chapek 9", which is inhabited solely by robots.
 In Howard Chaykin's Time² graphic novels, Rossum's Universal Robots is a powerful corporation and maker of robots.
 In Spacehunter: Adventures in the Forbidden Zone, when Wolff wakes Chalmers, she has been reading a copy of R.U.R. in her bed.  This presages the fact that she is later revealed to be a gynoid.
 In the 2016 video game Deus Ex: Mankind Divided, R.U.R. is performed in an underground theater in a dystopian Prague by an "augmented" (cyborg) woman who believes herself to be the robot Helena.
 In the 2018 British alternative history drama Agatha and the Truth of Murder, Agatha is seen reading R.U.R. to her daughter Rosalind as a bedtime story.
 In the 2021 movie Mother/Android, the play R.U.R. of Karel Čapek comes up. In the movie, Arthur, an AI programmer, turns to be an android.

See also 
 AI takeover
 The Steam Man of the Prairies (1868), an early American depiction of a "mechanical man"
 Tik-Tok, L. Frank Baum's earlier depiction (1907) of a similar entity
 Detroit: Become Human (2018), a narrative video game built around a rebellion by  androids who become sentient.

References 
Informational notes

Citations

External links 

 
 
 R.U.R. in Czech from Project Gutenberg
 Audio extracts from the SCI-FI-LONDON adaptation 
 Karel Čapek bio.
 Online facsimile version of the 1920 first edition in Czech.
 
 

1921 plays
Artificial intelligence in fiction
Plays by Karel Čapek
Works about robots
Science fiction theatre